Valerie Pringle Has Left The Building is a travel program hosted by Valerie Pringle and produced by CTV. There were thirty one episodes.

Episodes and airdates

See also
List of programs broadcast by CTV

External links
Valerie Pringle Official Homepage
Episode Guide

CTV Television Network original programming
2002 Canadian television series debuts
2006 Canadian television series endings
Canadian travel television series
2000s Canadian reality television series